Give and take may refer to:

 Give and Take (magazine), a Christadelphian Bible magazine aimed at 7- to 11-year-old Sunday School children
 Give and Take (Smith), a 2005 public artwork on the campus of Indiana University – Purdue University Indianapolis
 Give and Take (John Lindberg album), 1982
 Give and Take (The Dynamic Superiors album), 1977
 Give and Take (Mike Stern album), 1997 
 Give and Take (film), a 1928 silent film
 Give and Take, a 1978 album by UK psychedelic/space rock band Here & Now
 "Give and Take" (Red Dwarf), a 2016 episode of the TV series
 Quid pro quo, a favor for a favor